John Hawkins may refer to:

Public officials
 John Hawkins (naval commander) (1532–1595), English admiral
 John Hawkins (17th century diplomat), ambassador of the Kingdom of England to France, 1626–1627
 John Hawkins (MP) (c. 1611–?), English politician
 John Hawkins (burgess), member of the Virginia House of Burgesses
 John Hawkins (Maryland politician), American politician
 John Heywood Hawkins (1802–1877), British politician
 John Parker Hawkins (1830–1914), U.S. Civil War brigadier general
 John Joseph Hawkins (1840–1916), politician in Ontario, Canada
 John A. Hawkins (New York politician) (1864–1941), New York politician
 John J. Hawkins (1855–1935), American jurist and politician in the Arizona Territory
 John Clifford Hawkins (1879–?), African American lawyer and political figure
 John Hawkins (diplomat) (born 1960), British ambassador to Qatar
 John D. Hawkins (born 1968), South Carolina politician

Writers
 John Hawkins (grammarian) (c. 1587–c. 1641), English physician, grammarian and translator
 John Hawkins (author) (1719–1789), English music historian
 John Sidney Hawkins (baptised 1758–1842), English antiquarian, son of the music historian
 John Hawkins (geologist) (1761–1841), English geologist and writer
 John A. Hawkins (linguist) (born 1950), English linguist

Musicians
 John Hawkins (English composer), co-composed 1964's Canterbury Tales
 John Hawkins (Canadian composer) (1944–2007), Canadian classical composer
 Big Hawk, American rapper whose real name was John Hawkins (1969–2006)

Other
 John Hawkins (archdeacon of Totnes) (1903–1965), Anglican priest
 John Hawkins (archdeacon of Hampstead) (born 1963)
 John Isaac Hawkins (1772–1855), engineer and inventor of the upright piano, a mechanical pencil and a letter copying machine (the polygraph) 
 John Hawkins (athlete) (born 1949), Canadian high jumper
 John Hawkins (rower), Australian rower
 John Hawkins (Master of Pembroke College, Cambridge), Master of Pembroke College, Cambridge, 1728–1733
 TSS Sir John Hawkins (1929), passenger tender vessel

See also
 Jack Hawkins (disambiguation)
 John Hawkin, MP
 John Hawkins Hagarty (1816–1900), Canadian lawyer, teacher, and judge